A practical effect is a special effect produced physically, without computer-generated imagery or other post-production techniques. In some contexts, "special effect" is used as a synonym of "practical effect", in contrast to "visual effects" which are created in post-production through photographic manipulation or computer generation.

Many of the staples of action movies are practical effects. Gunfire, bullet wounds, rain, wind, fire, and explosions can all be produced on a movie set by someone skilled in practical effects. Non-human characters and creatures produced with make-up, prosthetics, masks, and puppets – in contrast to computer-generated images – are also examples of practical effects.

Practical effect techniques
 The use of prosthetic makeup, animatronics, puppetry, or creature suits to create the appearance of living creatures.
 Miniature effects, which is the use of scale models which are photographed in a way that they appear full sized.
 Mechanical effects, such as aerial rigging to simulate flight, stage mounted gimbals to make the ground move, or other mechanical devices to physically manipulate the environment.
 Pyrotechnics for the appearance of fire and explosions.
 Weather effects such as sprinkler systems to create rain and fog machines to create smoke.
 Squibs to create the illusion of gunshot wounds.

See also
Special effects
Computer-generated imagery
Visual effects
Optics: Visual effects

Special effects